The Renault Kangoo is a family of multi purpose vehicles manufactured and marketed by Renault since 1997, in commercial as well as passenger variants, across three generations. For the European market, the Kangoo is manufactured at the MCA plant in Maubeuge, France.

The Kangoo was also marketed as a rebadged variant by Nissan in Europe as the Nissan Kubistar (first generation), Nissan NV250 (second generation) and Nissan Townstar (third generation). In September 2012, Mercedes-Benz began marketing a rebadged variant of the second generation Kangoo as the Mercedes-Benz Citan, which is also marketed as Mercedes EQT and Mercedes T-Class for the current generation.

, the electric variant, the Renault Kangoo Z.E., is Europe's top selling all-electric light commercial vehicle, with global sales of 48,821 units since its inception in 2011.



First generation (KC/KW; 1997) 

The first generation Kangoo was introduced in October 1997, and was facelifted in March 2003, with new front end nose styling, especially the grille, standardised across the Renault range, with the Renault diamond mounted on a body colour panel in the centre of the grille and teardrop headlamps.

The rear windows and seats of the Kangoo could be removed, producing the panel van Kangoo Express. The Kangoo became popular with mobility impaired and wheelchair users due to its height and accessibility and because it could be adapted to include mounting points for wheelchairs. The rear of the vehicle is cut to allow a ramp to be fitted. A pair of front tie downs are fitted (retractable seat belts with a solenoid release to allow them to be extended, passed around the wheelchair frame and then locked back when the solenoid is switched off and they retract); this stops the wheelchair from moving back. A pair of rear tie downs with the normal clamping buckles stop the wheelchair from moving forward. A normal, long seat belt is worn by the wheelchair user.

Both the Kangoo and Kangoo Express were available in four-wheel drive versions. A lengthened version was also available, with an increased cargo area. A pickup version was sold in the Swedish market. In some countries, such as Malaysia, the Kangoo was assembled by Nissan with third row seats.

A badge-engineered version of the Kangoo panel van was sold as the Nissan Kubistar in many European markets. Nissan offered it from 1999 to 2009. Nissan applied the "X76" model code to the Kubistar. From July 2003, Wallace and Gromit starred in adverts in the United Kingdom for the Kangoo.

Break'Up
The Kangoo Break'Up was a four wheel drive concept car announced in August 2002 and previewed the facelift design due in 2003, together with a pick up-style rear. It was powered by 1.6 L engine producing .

Four wheel drive
The 4WD version of the Kangoo was introduced in 2002, and was marketed under the model name Trekka. It should not be confused with the Skoda powered New Zealand built utility vehicle named Trekka, which was marketed in the Antipodes for several years circa 1970.

The Kangoo Trekka's all wheel drive system differed from the Renault Scénic RX4 in its inclusion of a Nissan sourced automatic torque coupling "ATC", a hydraulic coupling that would engage drive on all four wheels should the front wheels start to lose traction.

This allowed the Kangoo Trekka to run in front wheel drive in most conditions, thus saving fuel. Working in combination with the ATC, the Kangoo Trekka featured an electronically controlled "ASR" traction control system which could brake the front wheels to arrest traction loss.

The suspension on the front had longer front struts with revised coil springs, lower suspension arms were revised to a cast steel item. The rear suspension was completely revised from the standard Kangoo torsion bar suspension beam axle to a fully independent coil sprung system with wishbones. The rear differential was centrally mounted with two driveshafts transmitting power to the rear wheels. All this was carried on a subframe which increased the ground clearance and wheel travel.

These changes gave the Kangoo Trekka a  fording depth and 28 degree hill climbing capability. The Kangoo Trekka was marketed in the UK with a choice of two engines, the 1.6 L 16 valve petrol engine and the 1.9 L dCi common rail turbodiesel both with a five speed manual gearbox.

In 2005, these models were priced at £12,600 and £13,600 respectively.

The interior of the Kangoo Trekka was spartan. The rear bench seat could be folded forward to provide a  loading area, with better access through the sliding side doors.

Engines
The Kangoo and Kangoo Express was/is available with a choice of multiple engines:
 1.0 L D Series petrol,  (8v) /  (16v)
 1.2 L D Series petrol,  (8v) /  (16v)
 1.4 L 8v Energy petrol, 
 1.6 L 16v K Series petrol, 
 1.5 L dCi turbo-diesel,  /  /  /  /  /  / 
 1.9 L F Series D diesel, / (normally aspirated, indirect injection)
 1.9 L F Series dTi turbodiesel,  (direct injection)
 1.9 L F Series dCi turbodiesel, /
 Electric Electri'cité (limited edition)
 Plug In Hybrid Elect'road (limited edition)

Some LPG and CNG variants of petrol engines have also been produced.

Electric vehicles based on Kangoo I
Cleanova II is a hybrid electric drive train system, used in a vehicle based on Renault Kangoo, with two electric versions: full electric vehicle (FEV) and plug-in hybrid vehicle (PHEV).

Second generation (FC/FW; 2007) 

The second-generation Kangoo are based on the Scénic and manufactured in Maubeuge. Sales began in May 2007. A seven seat version, which is longer by 40 cm, became available from July 2012.

They are also sold by Mercedes-Benz as the Mercedes-Benz Citan, with a revised front design, being launched in September 2012. In February 2012, Renault retired the Kangoo MPV, Espace, Laguna, Modus, and Wind lines in the United Kingdom.

A facelifted version of both the van and the passenger versions was available from the beginning of 2013.

In November 2018, it was announced that Nissan would rebadge the Kangoo, turning it into the NV250. The Nissan NV250 launched in December 2019 and is currently sold in the United Kingdom.

Body styles
The Kangoo is available in three wheelbase configurations: the Kangoo Express, the Kangoo Compact with a shorter wheelbase, and the Kangoo Express Maxi with a longer wheelbase – all three offered in passenger variants. The short wheelbase version was sold as the Kangoo Be Bop between 2009 and 2012.

Kangoo Be Bop
Following the 2007 Renault Kangoo Compact Concept, the Renault Kangoo Be Bop was presented at 2008 Paris Motor Show. Judged expensive and unpractical, the Kangoo Be Bop was a commercial failure, and only 1,400 units were produced between 2009 and 2011.

Kangoo Express Compact

Kangoo Express

Kangoo Express Maxi

Grand Kangoo

A 7-seater version of the Kangoo, named Grand Kangoo, has been on the market since July 2012.

Engines

Kangoo Z.E.

History
As part of its Z.E. electric car initiative, Renault has developed the Kangoo Z.E. model that is manufactured at its Maubeuge plant. A prototype was shown at the September 2010 International Commercial Vehicles Show in Hanover, Germany, and the electric van was released for retail sales in October 2011. In November 2011, the Kangoo Z.E. was voted International Van of the Year for 2012. It was also elected Electric Vehicle of the Year in 2012 and 2013 by GreenFleet.

It was introduced to Mexico on 15 October 2020. In 2021, the next-generation electric Kangoo was introduced as the Kangoo E-Tech electric, based on the Renault–Nissan CMF-C/D platform.

Sales
A total of 3,652 Kangoo Z.E. utility vans were registered in France through December 2012, and, with 2,869 units delivered in 2012, the electric van became the top selling plug-in electric vehicle in the country. During 2011, the Kangoo Z.E. sold 991 units in Europe, and cumulative sales in the region reached 6,658 units sold in the region through December 2012, with global sales of 6,665 units.

Worldwide cumulative sales passed the 10,000 mark by the start of September 2013, representing about 10% of overall Kangoo van global sales. The Kangoo Z.E. is the leader of the small all electric van segment, and the best selling electric vehicle in France, with 9,125 units registered through June 2014. The vehicle was updated in 2017.

The Kangoo Z.E. is Europe's top selling all-electric light commercial vehicle, with global sales of 48,821 units delivered since inception through December 2019.

Drivetrain
The Kangoo Z.E. has the same dimensions as the internal combustion model. It uses a synchronous electric motor with rotor coil. The vehicle is powered by a 22 kWh lithium-ion battery pack that delivers a combined cycle range of  NEDC which varies depending on factors such as type of road, ambient temperature, speed or driving style. Maximum charging power is limited to 3.7 kW (AC).

Kangoo Z.E. Power+, released in 2017, includes four changes; new battery, new motor, new charger, and a heat pump. The new battery has a capacity of 33 kWh for a range of  according to the NEDC cycle. The new R60 traction motor produces the same peak power , but was developed by Renault, based on the R90 motor found in Renault Zoe. Charging power has doubled to 7 kW, and the heat pump provides a more efficient method of heating the cabin.

Third generation (KFK; 2021) 

The third-generation Kangoo was revealed on 12 November 2020, alongside the lower-spec, separate model called Express. It is based on an all-new CMF-CD platform developed by Renault and Nissan.

A rebadged version called the Nissan Townstar was revealed in September 2021 to replace the NV200 and NV250 in various markets. In Europe, the electric Nissan e-NV200 will be replaced by a Townstar EV based on the Kangoo E-Tech Electric.

Engines

Dimensions

Notes

Kangoo E-Tech Electric
The third generation Renault Kangoo was previewed by the Renault Kangoo Z.E. concept presented on April 23, 2019, which was said to be 80% representative of the production model. The Kangoo Z.E. concept (2019) is an electric vehicle and has no pillar at the leading edge of the sliding side door to facilitate access, like the Frendzy concept. A prototype of the production electric Kangoo, renamed to Kangoo Van E-Tech Electric, was first shown in March 2021. It was officially introduced in November 2021 to succeed the prior electric Kangoo Z.E., which was based on the second-generation Kangoo and had been produced since 2011. Production was scheduled to start in 2022.

The 100% electric production panel van model entered production in June 2022. The passenger version was launched in October 2022 at the 2022 Paris Motor Show.

The standard onboard charger is limited to 11 kW (AC); as an option, the vehicle can be fitted with a charger that allows input power up to 80 kW (DC) or 22 kW (AC).

Safety

Euro NCAP
The Kangoo in its standard European configuration received 4 stars from Euro NCAP in 2021.

The Townstar in its standard European configuration received 4 stars from Euro NCAP in 2021.

References

External links

 Renault Kangoo website

Kangoo
Production electric cars
Cars introduced in 1997
2000s cars
2010s cars
2020s cars
Vans
Front-wheel-drive vehicles
Electric cars
Electric vans
Plug-in hybrid vehicles
Euro NCAP small MPVs
Cars of Argentina